Margot Hellwig (born Margot Fischer, 5 July 1941 also in Reit, married as Margot Lindermayr) is a German volksmusik singer.

She is best known as part of Maria & Margot Hellwig, a German mother and daughter volksmusik music duo which was active from 1963 until the mother Maria Hellwig's death in 2010. The surname Hellwig was a stagename for both singers.

References

1941 births
Living people
German folk singers